Abdelrahman Farouk (born June 9, 1984) is an Egyptian professional footballer who plays as a right back for the Egyptian club El-Entag El-Harby. In July 2017, Farouk signed a 3-year contract for El-Entag, Al-Ittihad tried to sign the player again but El-Entag refused.

References

External links
Abdelrahman Farouk at KOOORA.com

Living people
1984 births
Egyptian footballers
Egyptian Premier League players
Association football defenders
Haras El Hodoud SC players
Smouha SC players
Al Ittihad Alexandria Club players
El Entag El Harby SC players